Todd Alcott (born October 22, 1961) is an American screenwriter, playwright, actor, and director. He was born in Crystal Lake, Illinois.

Filmography

Writer 
 1996 : Just Your Luck
 1998 : Antz
 1999 : Curtain Call
 2000 : CyberWorld ("Antz" segment and story)
 2001 : Valentine (uncredited rewrite)
 2003 : Grasshopper (short)
 2007 : Enchanted (uncredited rewrite)

Actor
 1991 : Thrill Kill Video Club
 1993 : Six Degrees of Separation as Concertgoer
 1994 : The Hudsucker Proxy as Mailroom Screamer

Director
 2003 : Grasshopper
 2008: The Bentfootes
 2014: The Occupants

References

External links

http://www.toddalcott.com/

American male screenwriters
American male film actors
People from Crystal Lake, Illinois
Male actors from Illinois
1961 births
Living people
Film directors from Illinois
Screenwriters from Illinois